A list of permanent working clocks with the largest faces in the world. Entries include all clocks with faces at least  in diameter. Clocks can be located on the exterior or interior of buildings, and towers as well as on the ground as is the case with floral clock faces.

Temporarily installed clocks 
A list of clocks with the largest faces that have been installed as temporary structures. Inclusion in this list follows the criteria for the list above except for the temporary nature of the clock.

Demolished clocks 
A list of the largest faced clocks that have been destroyed or demolished since their construction. Inclusion in this list follows the criteria for the list above except for the fact that the clocks are no longer extant.

See also
List of clocks
List of tallest clock towers

References